Ali Badawi (3 October 1940 – 6 December 2007) was an Egyptian footballer. He competed in the men's tournament at the 1960 Summer Olympics.

References

External links
 

1940 births
2007 deaths
Egyptian footballers
Egypt international footballers
Olympic footballers of Egypt
Footballers at the 1960 Summer Olympics
Footballers from Cairo
Association football defenders
20th-century Egyptian people